Ely Drago was an Italian film actress.

She played Jocasta in Ercole al centro della terra (1961), directed by Mario Bava and starring Christopher Lee, Leonora Ruffo and Marisa Belli, and Gina in Sua Eccellenza si fermò a mangiare (1961), directed by Mario Mattòli.

Filmography
 Le sedicenni (1965)
 Man from Canyon City (1965) as Rosario
 Hercules in the Haunted World (1961) as Giocasta
 Sua Eccellenza si fermò a mangiare (1961) as Gina
 Aventura en Capri (1959) as Una turista

References

External links
 

Date of birth missing
Date of death missing
Italian film actresses